Wolfgang Jörg (born 1963) is a German politician, representative of the Social Democratic Party. He is a member of parliament in the federal state of North Rhine-Westphalia.

See also
List of Social Democratic Party of Germany politicians
List of members of the Landtag of North Rhine-Westphalia 2017-2022

References

Social Democratic Party of Germany politicians
1963 births
Living people